The 2009 Judo Grand Slam Paris was held in Paris, France, from 7 to 8 February 2009.

Medal summary
Results:

Men's events

Women's events

Medal table

Prize money
The sums written are per medalist, bringing the total prizes awarded to $154,000.

References

External links
 

2009 Judo Grand Slam Paris
2009 Judo Grand Slam Paris
Judo
Grand Slam Paris 2009
Judo
2009 in Paris
Judo